The 1923 Hammond Pros season was their fourth in the league. The team improved on their previous output of 0–5–1, winning one game. They finished fifteenth in the league.

Schedule

The Pros' second game of the season was the only one they ever played in their home city of Hammond; most of their "home" games were played at Cubs Park in Chicago. The game, played at A. Murray Turner Field (mostly used for baseball with a capacity of only a few thousand), produced Hammond's only win of the 1923 season, 7–0 over the Dayton Triangles. The game's only score came in the fourth quarter when left end "Inky" Williams scooped up a fumble at the Dayton ten-yard-line and returned it for a touchdown; future Pro Football Hall of Famer Fritz Pollard kicked the extra point. (It would also be the last regular-season NFL game played in Indiana for over 60 years, until the Indianapolis Colts moved from Baltimore in 1984.)

Standings

References

Hammond Pros seasons
Hammond Pros
1923 in sports in Indiana